Satyam Sankaramanchi (3 March 1937 – 1987) was a storyteller, born in the village of Amaravati near Guntur City, in Andhra Pradesh, India. The stories he told wove a whole new world around the tiny village of Amaravati. 

Amaravati Kathalu is regarded by Mullapudi as one of the best short story series in Telugu. P. S. Murthy mentions that Amaravati Kathalu is one of the best volumes of short stories in Telugu. D. Anjaneylu mentions that it is a notable work.

His short story "The Flood" has been translated into English. Some of his stories were also televised by the movie maker Shyam Benegal as a series called Amravathi Ki Kathayen. 
Died on April 21 1987

Selected works
Ākhari Prēmalēkha
Amarāvati Kathalu
Kārtīka Dīpālu
Rēpaṭidāri

Notes

Telugu writers
People from Guntur district
1987 deaths
1937 births
Indian storytellers
Writers from Andhra Pradesh
20th-century Indian writers